Különös ismertetőjel ('A strange mask of identity') is a Hungarian movie, produced in 1955. It was directed by Zoltán Várkonyi. The plot of the movie is set in the Hungarian communist resistance during Second World War.

References

External links
 

1955 films
Hungarian drama films
1950s Hungarian-language films
Films directed by Zoltán Várkonyi
1955 drama films
Hungarian black-and-white films